Krvavý román (int. English title 'Horror Story') is a 1993 Czech film by Jaroslav Brabec. The film starrs Josef Kemr.

The film is based on Josef Váchal's 1924 novel of the same title.

References

External links
 
 https://www.filmcenter.cz/en/czech-films-people/1067-horror-story

1993 films
Czech fantasy adventure films
1990s Czech-language films